Regine is a 1935 German drama film directed by Erich Waschneck and starring Luise Ullrich, Anton Walbrook and Olga Tschechowa. It was shot at the Grunewald Studios in Berlin. The film's sets were designed by Otto Erdmann and Hans Sohnle.

Cast
 Luise Ullrich as Regine
 Anton Walbrook as Frank Reynold, Ingenieur
 Olga Tschechowa as Floris Bell, Schauspielerin
 Ekkehard Arendt as Merlin, Floris Bells Begleiter
 Hans Junkermann as Professor Gisevius, Franks Onkel
 Eduard von Winterstein as Keller, Regines Vater
 Hans Adalbert Schlettow as Robert, Regines Bruder 
 Kurt Ackermann 
 Olga Engl as Frau Sendig
 Walter Gross 
 Erich Gühne 
 Trude Haefelin 
 Eric Harden 
 Jutta Jol 
 Otto Kronburger 
 Carl Walther Meyer 
 Hermann Meyer-Falkow 
 Aribert Mog 
 Ernst Albert Schaach 
 Betty Sedlmayr 
 Julia Serda as Frau von Steckler
 Martha von Konssatzki as Obstfrau

References

Bibliography 
 Bock, Hans-Michael & Bergfelder, Tim. The Concise Cinegraph: Encyclopaedia of German Cinema. Berghahn Books, 2009.
 Klaus, Ulrich J. Deutsche Tonfilme: Jahrgang 1933. Klaus-Archiv, 1988.

External links 
 

1935 films
1935 drama films
Films of Nazi Germany
German drama films
1930s German-language films
Films directed by Erich Waschneck
Films based on short fiction
Films based on works by Gottfried Keller
German black-and-white films
1930s German films